The City of Perth is a local government area and body, within the Perth metropolitan area, which is the capital of Western Australia. The local government is commonly known as Perth City Council. The City covers the Perth city centre and surrounding suburbs. On 1 July 2016 the City expanded, absorbing 1,247 residents from the City of Subiaco.

History

In 1829, Captain James Stirling founded Perth as part of the Swan River Colony. A Perth Town Trust was formed in 1838, but remained largely non-functional for many years due to lack of finance and administrative capacity leading to its dissolution in 1858. The City of Perth was officially declared on 23 September 1856 with Council meeting for the first time in December 1858. In 1871, the City of Perth was reconsituted as a Municipal Corporation.

In 1915, following the efforts of WE Bold and the greater Perth movement, the City absorbed the Municipality of North Perth (1901) and the Municipality of Leederville (1895), and on 1 November 1917, the Municipality of Victoria Park was also absorbed. A year later, it absorbed territory from Perth Road Board (including the Belmont Park Racecourse) and purchased the 526 hectares (1,300 acres) Limekilns Estate in the western suburbs. The City developed the suburbs of Floreat Park, Wembley Park and City Beach on these lands.

In 1925, a new City of Perth Act gave the City additional powers over building control and regulation, including the power to declare new streets. In 1930 the first town planning committee was established.

Criticism of the City’s governance by the David Davidson, the state's Town Planning Commissioner, led to a Royal Commission in 1938 on the grounds that the development of the western suburbs had led to the neglect of health and building administration in the central city area.

By 1962, the council had 27 members representing nine wards. In 1963 the  Metropolitan Region Town Planning Scheme Act required the City to establish a town planning department—which they did by appointing architect Paul Ritter in 1965. Ritter’s two year tenure was short and turbulent, leading to public conflict with councillors and his termination in 1967.

The City’s first town planning scheme was submitted to the Town Planning Board in 1973, but not formally adopted until 1985. The reason for the delay was a state government desire to take discretionary powers out of the hands of the Council. Council was felt to be too easily influenced by powerful developers.

On 1 July 1994, following the passage of the City of Perth Restructuring Act (1993), the City of Perth was broken up and a significantly reduced City of Perth constituted. The Town of Shepperton, Town of Cambridge and Town of Vincent were created from the former boundaries of the City. The first elections were held on 6 May 1995, with eight councillors and a mayor.

The City of Perth Act 2016 defined Perth as the capital of Western Australia, and expanded the City's boundaries to include a number of landmarks including Kings Park, University of Western Australia, Perth Children's Hospital and the Queen Elizabeth II Medical Centre. The boundary changes took effect on 1 July 2016.

The Perth City Council was suspended on 2 March 2018, pending the establishment of a public inquiry into the council, by Local Government Minister David Templeman. The council was administered by three Commissioners until 18 October 2020. The two-year Inquiry carried out up until that point, conducted at a cost of nearly A$8.0m made many findings, none of which resulted in criminal conviction.

In July 2021, the City of Perth formally recognised the Whadjuk Noongar people as the traditional owners of Noongar Country, the land on which the "City of Perth (Boorloo)" is located, signing the agreement "Yacker Danjoo Ngala Bidi" with Whadjuk elders on 10 August.

Council

Suburbs
The suburbs of the City of Perth with population and size figures based on the most recent Australian census:

* The parts of these suburbs north of Newcastle and Summers Streets fall within the City of Vincent. These localities are only partially contained within the City of Perth boundary.
** The parts of these localities were transferred from the City of Subiaco in 2016. These localities are only partially contained within the City of Perth boundary.

Population

Pre-1915 composition

1915–1994 composition

The 1991 population has been broken down by the Australian Bureau of Statistics as follows: Perth (C) 7,604; Cambridge (T) 22,740; Victoria Park (T) 24,313; Vincent (T) 24,765.

1994–present composition

Twin towns and sister cities

The City of Perth is twinned with:

Flag and coat of arms

The official Flag of Perth represents the city of Perth, Western Australia. It features the Saint George's Cross overlaid with the coat of arms of Perth in the centre. Though the designer of the flag is unknown, it is thought to have been designed prior to 1872. In the 1920s, the black swan was removed from the top left quadrant of the flag and replaced with the coat of arms in the centre of the cross.

The coat of arms were originally granted to the City of Perth on 2 December 1926. They were altered with the addition of part of the arms of Perth, Scotland in 1949.

Heritage listed places

As of 2021, 1,053 places are heritage-listed in the City of Perth, of which 220 are on the State Register of Heritage Places.

References

External links

 

 
1949 establishments in Australia
Perth